The 1988 All-SEC football team consists of American football players selected to the All-Southeastern Conference (SEC) chosen by various selectors for the 1988 college football season.

Offensive selections

Receivers
Boo Mitchell, Vanderbilt (AP-1)
Tony Moss, LSU (AP-1)

Tight ends 
 Wesley Walls, Ole Miss (AP-1)

Tackles
David Williams, Florida (AP-1)
Jim Thompson, Auburn (AP-1)

Guards 
Rodney Garner, Auburn (AP-1)
Larry Rose, Alabama (AP-1)

Centers 
Todd Wheeler, Georgia (AP-1)

Quarterbacks 

 Reggie Slack, Auburn (AP-1)

Running backs 

 Tim Worley, Georgia (AP-1)
Emmitt Smith, Florida (College Football Hall of Fame) (AP-1)

Defensive selections

Tackles 
Tracy Rocker, Auburn (AP-1)
Trace Armstrong, Florida (AP-1)

Middle guards
Benji Roland, Auburn (AP-1)

Linebackers 
 Derrick Thomas, Alabama (AP-1)
Quentin Riggins, Auburn (AP-1)
Ron Sancho, LSU (AP-1)
Keith DeLong, Tennessee (AP-1)
Randy Holleran, Kentucky (AP-1)

Backs 
Louis Oliver, Florida (AP-1)
Steven Moore, Ole Miss (AP-1)
Greg Jackson, LSU (AP-1)

Special teams

Kicker 
David Browndyke, LSU (AP-1)

Punter 

 Brian Shulman, Auburn (AP-1)

Key
AP = Associated Press

UPI = United Press International

Bold = Consensus first-team selection by both AP and UPI

See also
1988 College Football All-America Team

References

All-SEC
All-SEC football teams